Cyclone Andrea was an intense European windstorm that affected western and central Europe in early January 2012.

Meteorological history
Closely following Cyclone Ulli, Andrea, the first named storm of 2012 formed southwest of Iceland on 3 January, moving down into the North Sea, and affecting the United Kingdom, Netherlands, Denmark, and Germany. The storm impacted Western Europe through 9 January before dissipating.

Naming
All low-pressure areas that affect Europe are named by the Free University of Berlin. The Free University of Berlin have six lists of names which they use each year. Every even year they use female names, while every odd year they use male names.

Impacts

British Isles
Across the UK 100,000 homes were left without electricity. Widespread damage occurred in Nottinghamshire, with more than 900 homes left without power. The roofs of two houses were blown off in Lincolnshire, with many roads closed and fallen trees.
The worst affected area was Southern Scotland where several weather stations reported their highest gust on record. More than 100,000 Scottish homes and businesses were left without electricity.

European North Sea and Baltic Sea coasts

Netherlands
As the storm crossed the North Sea, the combination of low pressure, shallow waters and high winds piling water against the coast led to a storm surge developing along the coast. Across the North Sea coast of Europe the storm surge combined with heavy rains leading to flooding. 
 The first week of January 2012 brought  of rain in the Netherlands, the usual amount for the whole of January. Storm Andrea brought strong winds (up to force 9) thunder and hail Due to the high sea levels, the heavy rainfall could not be discharged as easily from the land without the risk of coastal flooding.

Operations in the port of Rotterdam were limited with eleven ships unable to leave, and two unable to enter. Pilot services for vessels coming into the port were also restricted. Most flights were disrupted at Amsterdam Schiphol airport. Ferry services were also withdrawn to the Islands off the Dutch coast.

Dyke leaking in northern Netherlands in danger of breaching saw residents evacuated by the army and police

Germany
In Nord Rhein Westphalia the Rhine rose to flood levels close to Cologne, with vessels restricted to the middle of the river and flood defences being deployed. The Federal Maritime and Hydrographic Agency (BSH) issued warnings for expected storm surges along the Northern German coast in North Frisia and Hamburg. Trees fell onto power lines in the state of Saxony, leaving thousands without power, also in middle Saxony and Bautzen. In Regensburg the roof of a furniture store was badly damaged. Damage to the English Garden in Munich. A local train is derailed by a fallen tree at Reken in Münsterland, four passengers and the driver escaped without harm. Railway was closed after a tree fell on a train in Geltendorf, Augsburg.

Belgium, France
In Nord Pas De Calais 5800 homes were left without power. In the port of Calais the SeaFrance ferry Berlioz slipped its moorings and crossed the harbour before striking the Ile de Batz, a cable laying ship belonging to Alcatel during winds of  according to the harbourmaster. Also in Étaples a wind turbine lost two blades. The Belgian met office issued a code orange warning for the whole country and the Øresund Bridge was also closed between Denmark and Sweden due to the storm. In Belgium the roof of a school blown off in Quenast, Walloon Brabant. Liège Airport experienced flight delays with 2 cargo planes being forced to divert to other airports. Rising river levels were reported across the country.

Central Europe and European Alps
In Upper Franconia, Germany a 43-year-old man died following a frontal collision, according to police after a gust pushed the car into oncoming traffic. In Ostallgäu, Bavaria lightning struck a 15th-century church tower, setting it on fire. The strong winds and snow thwarted attempts to stop the fire and the tower eventually collapsed.
In Switzerland the storm blocked railways and disrupted flights at Zurich airport, with Central Switzerland and the Zurich wine growing areas worst affected.  gusts were recorded close to the city of Zurich on 5 January. The storm brought heavy snow and avalanche warnings to western Austria. Unusually heavy snows also buried towns and blocked roads in Austria's western Tyrol and Vorarlberg federal-states leading to avalanche warnings. Meanwhile, authorities were searching for a missing 15-year-old skier near Innsbruck. The Austrian national weather service reported that such large snowfalls occur approximately once a decade. In the French Alps 20,000 homes were left without power as high winds and snow caused blackouts, with Haute-Savoie, Isère, and Savoy departments particularly affected.

Further afield
Forecasters in France warned that the storm would continue south to Corsica in the Mediterranean, with both departments being put on orange alert by Meteo France. All flights to the island were suspended on the afternoon of 5 January.

Aftermath
Austrian rescue workers abandoned the search for a missing 15-year-old skier on 13 January, despite the best efforts of sniffer dogs, heat sensors, radar, and 450 personnel. The search was hampered by severe risk of avalanches in the area due to the heavy snow. Hundreds of tourists were 
trapped in the Austrian resort of Ischgl after police closed the resort following two avalanches. Lifts were turned off and army helicopters were called to airlift inexperienced skiers to safety. Interpolis, a subsidiary of the biggest Dutch insurance company, Achmea, stated that it had received about 2 million euros in claims for wind and rain damage in the first week of 2012, which includes damages relating to Cyclone Ulli.

See also

European windstorm
List of European windstorms
Cyclone Xaver
Hurricane Bawbag
Cyclone Joachim
Cyclone Ulli

References

Andrea
2012 meteorology
Andrea
Andrea
2012 disasters in the United Kingdom
2012 in Germany
January 2012 events in Europe